Zygaena manlia is a species of moth in the Zygaenidae family. It is found in Armenia, Turkey and Iran.In Seitz it is described as - "Similar to Zygaena cuvieri  and with an equally broad rosy red collar and abdominal belt , but the blackish bands separating the red areas of the forewing are much broader, the distal area being represented by an irregular half-divided patch. North Persia"

References

External links
Lepiforum.de]
Images representing Zygaena manlia at Bold

Moths described in 1870
Zygaena